Kaala masala is a Maharashtrian spice mixture (masala). The Maharashtra region has quite few varieties of masala which distinguishes Maharashtrian food from other aromas and flavours of India. Stronger and spicier flavours are significant aspects of Maharashtra. This special masala makes it easy to prepare Maharashtrian items like usal, varan and masala bhat.

Some of the main ingredients of kaala masala are cumin seeds, coriander seeds, clove, cinnamon sticks, kalpasi, coconut, sesame seeds and chillies. "Kaala" means "black" in the Marathi language and this refers to both the colour of the final masala and the ingredients which it contains. Typically, it will be prepared from dark spices such as cloves and cinnamon and the spices will be roasted until they obtain a dark colour.

References

External links 
 Kala Masala on CurryPowders.orf

Maharashtrian cuisine
Masalas